Firuzabad District is a district (bakhsh) in Selseleh County, Lorestan Province, Iran. At the 2006 census, its population was 17,201, in 4,579 families. The District has one city, Firuzabad, and two Rural Districts (dehestans), Firuzabad Rural District and Qalayi Rural District.

References 

Districts of Lorestan Province
Selseleh County